Mill Creek is a tributary of Whitelock Creek in Wyoming County, Pennsylvania, in the United States. The surficial geology in its vicinity consists mainly of alluvium, Wisconsinan Till, bedrock, Wisconsinan Ice-Contact Stratified Drift, and loess.

Course

Mill Creek begins in an unnamed lake in Northmoreland Township. It flows east-southeast for a short distance before turning east-northeast and flowing into a valley. After several tenths of a mile, the creek turns east for several tenths of a mile before turning northeast for several tenths of a mile and passing through a pond or small lake. It then turns southeast for several tenths of a mile before turning east for a short distance and then turning northeast. A few tenths of a mile further downstream, the creek turns northeast for a short distance before gradually turning east and then south. After several tenths of a mile, it crosses Pennsylvania Route 292 and reaches its confluence with Whitelock Creek.

Geography and geology

The surficial geology near the mouth of Mill Creek mainly consists of alluvium and Wisconsinan Ice-Contact Stratified Drift. However, slightly further upstream, Wisconsinan Till dominates. Alluvium again occurs along the creek in its middle and upper reaches, although larger Wisconsinan Till and bedrock consisting of sandstone and shale occur nearby. There are also a few patches of loess, which contains silt and fine sand.

There is a pipeline in the watershed of Mill Creek. In 2013, this pipeline was found to violate the Clean Streams Law. Mill Creek has been one of the receiving streams for Williams Field Services Company, LLC's erosion and sediment control permit.

Watershed
The mouth of the creek is in the United States Geological Survey quadrangle of Ransom. However, its source is in the quadrangle of Center Moreland.

History
Mill Creek was entered into the Geographic Names Information System on August 2, 1979. Its identifier in the Geographic Names Information System is 1199158.

A concrete stringer/multi-beam or girder bridge carrying State Route 2002 was built over Mill Creek in 1930.

Biology
Wild trout naturally reproduce in Mill Creek from its headwaters downstream to its mouth. The creek is designated as a Coldwater Fishery.

See also
List of rivers of Pennsylvania

References

Rivers of Wyoming County, Pennsylvania
Tributaries of the Susquehanna River
Rivers of Pennsylvania